Prussian Blue was an American white power music duo which was composed of Lynx Vaughan Gaede and Lamb Lennon Gaede, fraternal twins who were born on June 30, 1992, in Bakersfield, California. The duo was formed in early 2003 by their mother April Gaede, a member of the neo-Nazi organization National Vanguard. Their music was described as racist and white supremacist, promoting neo-Nazi rhetoric such as Holocaust denial.

Lynx and Lamb were about 14 years old when they decided to cease touring. In a 2011 interview with The Daily, a U.S. and Australian news app, the twins renounced their previous political views.

History

In an interview with Vice Magazine, the twins stated, "Part of our heritage is German American. Also our eyes are blue, and Prussian Blue is just a really pretty color." They also remarked, "there is also the discussion of the lack of 'Prussian Blue' coloring (Zyklon B residue) in the so-called gas chambers in the concentration camps. We think it might make people question some of the inaccuracies of the 'Holocaust' myth." This is a reference to claims made by many Holocaust deniers that the Holocaust either did not happen or had far fewer victims than generally believed.

Lynx and Lamb Gaede first performed together by singing at a white nationalist festival called "Eurofest" in 2001. They began learning how to play instruments in 2002 (Lamb plays the guitar and Lynx plays the violin). In the same year they appeared on a VH1 special called Inside Hate Rock. In 2003, they were featured in a Louis Theroux BBC documentary, entitled Louis and the Nazis, on racism and white supremacy in the United States. Lamb, Lynx, and their mother, April Gaede, also appeared in the low-budget 2003 horror film Dark Walker.

The twins recorded and released a debut CD at the end of 2004 called Fragment of the Future (Resistance Records) which had both acoustic folk-rock and bubblegum-pop sounds. A year later, they recorded their second album, The Path We Chose, which has a more traditional rock sound including both acoustic and electric guitar. Most of the songs on the second album lack the racial and white supremacist overtones of Fragment of the Future and are about more mainstream subject matter, like boys, crushes, and dating. On October 20, 2005, Prussian Blue was featured in a critical segment on ABC's Primetime. A DVD, Blonde Hair Blue Eyes, featuring three music videos and some live performances, was released in 2005. The pair toured the United States in 2005. On August 22, 2006, they were again featured in a critical segment on ABC's Primetime.

The twins moved with their mother and stepfather, Mark Harrington, and their younger half-sister, Dresden, from Bakersfield to Kalispell in Montana, in 2006; in their mother's words, Bakersfield was "not white enough." Some of their new neighbors did not welcome them; many city residents passed out flyers warning people of the family's views, and signs proclaiming "No Hate Here" appeared on some windows around the town. Some of the people who passed out flyers received threatening letters from members of out-of-state white supremacist organizations.<ref name=abcnews>{{cite web |url=https://abcnews.go.com/Primetime/story?id=2449483&page=1 |title=Town Tells White Separatist Singers 'No Hate Here |website=ABCnews.com |author=Bill Redeker |date=2006-09-15 |access-date=2007-11-12 }}</ref> The Montana Human Rights Network planned a rally in Kalispell to protest against the family's racist views.

The twins toured Europe in the summer of 2007, performing at events for white nationalist organizations. They also appeared as guests on The Political Cesspool. But as of early 2009, the band's website and MySpace page were no longer operational.

Ideology
The duo had strong ties to the National Vanguard organization, a "white nationalist" group which was formed by disaffected former members of the National Alliance. Their ideology has been described as racist and white supremacist by mainstream media outlets. The Daily Telegraph reported that, on stage, the twins executed Nazi salutes.

According to ABC News, the girls were homeschooled by their mother, April Gaede, an activist and a writer for the white nationalist organization National Vanguard. The twins' maternal grandfather, who lives in Squaw Valley, Fresno County, California, wears a Nazi swastika belt buckle; he also features the swastika on his truck and he has registered it as a cattle brand. During their ABC interview, the twins said they believed that Adolf Hitler was a great man with good ideas, and they described the Holocaust as being exaggerated. They have also been criticized for stipulating that the goods they donated to Hurricane Katrina victims should only go to white people: "After a day of trying, the supplies ended up with few takers, dumped at a local shop that sells Confederate memorabilia."

A 2011 profile in The Daily describes the twins' rejection of some of their previous political views as follows:

But after enrolling in public school and moving to Montana — a predominantly white state, albeit one with a decidedly hippie-ish vibe — Lamb and Lynx decided they simply no longer believed what they'd been taught. ..."I'm glad we were in the band," Lynx said, "but I think we should have been pushed toward something a little more mainstream and easier for us to handle than being front-men for a belief system that we didn't even completely understand at that time. We were little kids.

Despite this, they still made statements in which they expressed their skepticism about some elements of The Holocaust.

Lyrics and influences
About half of the songs on Prussian Blue's first album are covers of other songs which were put out by other white pride bands and one of them was co-written by David Lane and a few of the other songs were written by Ian Stuart Donaldson. One of their cover songs was put out by the racist band RaHoWa. Two of Prussian Blue's original compositions on their first album are dedicated to prominent Nazis and white nationalist activists.

Prussian Blue also released a cover of a song titled "Ocean of Warriors" in mp3 format, dedicated to white participants in the 2005 Sydney, Australia race rioting.

In 2006, a compilation album was released by the far right National Democratic Party of Germany (NPD) titled For The Fatherland.

Media
Prussian Blue appeared in two British television documentaries. The first, 2003's Louis and the Nazis by documentary maker Louis Theroux, was an account of white nationalists, including Prussian Blue. The second, Nazi Pop Twins, by James Quinn, was first aired in 2007. This documentary stressed the tension that existed between the twins and their mother, April. In this documentary, Lynx and Lamb disavowed their mother's race-related views and said that they want to perform music that was not focused on race. Lynx told Quinn that they wore the infamous T-shirts bearing a smiley face that resembled Adolf Hitler because she believed they "were a joke" and said that "being proud of being white" did not mean she was a racist. Louis Theroux revisited the twins and their mother to collect material for his book Call of the Weird.

In early September 2020, the twins were featured in another documentary by Louis Theroux called Louis Theroux - Life on the Edge: Beyond Belief which originally aired on BBC Two which explored the twin's journey of leaving what they described as their racist ideology.

Discography
Albums
 Fragment of the Future (2004)
 The Path We Chose (2005)
 For the Fatherland'' (compilation, 2006)

Singles
 "Your Daddy"
 "Keepers of the Light" (Battlecry featuring Prussian Blue)
 "Stand Up"
 "I Will Bleed for You"

References

External links

 
 
 Prussian Blue Official Website (defunct) from Archive.org
 

1992 births
All-female bands
American child singers
American people of German descent
Former white supremacists
Family musical groups
Living people
Musical groups disestablished in 2008
Musical groups established in 2003
Musical groups from Bakersfield, California
Musical groups from Montana
Sibling musical duos
American twins
Year of birth missing (living people)
American musical duos